The New South Wales Bar Association is a professional body of lawyers responsible for the regulation of the legal profession in the state of New South Wales, Australia. The body administers the bar examination in accordance with the Legal Profession Uniform Law (NSW).

History
Formerly known as the Council of the Bar of New South Wales, the organisation was incorporated on 22 October 1936 as 'The New South Wales Bar Association'. The College of Arms granted the Bar Association's coat of arms in 1959.

Presidents

Arms

Notes

References

External links
 NSW Bar Association

Bar associations
Legal organisations based in Australia
New South Wales law
1936 establishments in Australia